Ferne Labati (born June 2, 1947) is the former women's basketball program head coach at Seton Hill University. She previously served as the head women's basketball coach at University of Miami, where she became the school's all-time winningest coach. Throughout her coaching career, she has amassed 451 wins, making her only the 39th ever coach to win 400 games. She was named the Russell Athletic/WBCA National Coach of the Year in 1992.

At Miami, she was named to the University of Miami Athletic Hall of Fame. She has coached one Kodak All-American, one Big East player of the year, and one Big East rookie of the year at Miami. In 1989, she led Miami to its first ever NCAA tournament appearance. In 1992 and 1993, Miami won back-to-back Big East regular season championships, making the NCAA in both years. In 1993, the Hurricanes finished the year ranked 6th in the nation, their highest ranking ever. She also coached for four seasons at Farleigh Dickinson University

Coaching Record

External links
 Ferne Labati bio

References

Fairleigh Dickinson Knights women's basketball coaches
Miami Hurricanes women's basketball coaches
Living people
Seton Hill University
Place of birth missing (living people)
1947 births
American women's basketball coaches